Nikka may refer to:

Organizations 
Nikka Whisky Distilling, a Japanese whisky bottling company

People 
Nikka Costa (born 1972), American singer
Nikka Edvardine Katajainen, a fictional character from Strike Witches
Nikka Graff Lanzarone (born 1984), actress and dancer
Nikka Valencia, Filipino film, television and theater actress
Nikka Vonen (1836–1933), Norwegian educator, folklorist and author

Places 
Nikka Yuko Japanese Garden, a garden near Henderson Lake

Other
Nikka, a fashion style of Fjällräven
Nikka zubon, Japanese knickerbockers-style worker's pants

See also
Nika (disambiguation)